Viviennea euricosilvai is a moth in the family Erebidae first described by Lauro Travassos and Lauro Pereira Travassos-Filho in 1954. It is found in Brazil.

References

Phaegopterina
Moths described in 1954